Sarva is a musical genre found in the Bushehr region of Iran. It consists of the singing of free-metre couplets, often accompanied by the Iranian bagpipe, the ney anban.

References

Iranian styles of music